South Korea (IOC designation:Korea) participated in the 1962 Asian Games held in Jakarta, Indonesia from August 24, 1962 to September 4, 1962.

Medal summary

Medal table

Medalists

References

Korea, South
1962
Asian Games